Gunnar Edvard Heckscher (8 July 190924 November 1987) was a Swedish political scientist and leader of the Rightist Party, which later became the Moderate Party.

Biography
Heckscher was born in Djursholm, son of economist Eli Heckscher and writer and teacher Ebba Heckscher. He graduated from Uppsala University in 1927 and obtained a PhD 1934, the same year he married Anna Britta Vickhoff. He lectured in political science at Uppsala between 1933 and 1941 and at what later became Stockholm University between 1941 and 1948. He was Dean of the Social Institute of Stockholm 1945–1954. He became a professor in 1948 and worked at both the Social Institute and at Stockholm University.

Heckscher was a member of the Riksdag for Stockholm between 1957 and 1965.

After having been deputy chairman, Heckscher was elected leader of the party in 1961 and served until 1965. He was an early supporter of Swedish membership of the European Community.
He was later the Swedish ambassador to India from 1965 to 1970 and Japan from 1970 to 1975.

In 1987, he was awarded the Illis quorum.

Heckscher died in Uppsala on 24 November 1987 and is buried at Skogskyrkogården in Stockholm. One of his sons is Sten Heckscher, Social Democratic politician and later National Police Commissioner.

References

1909 births
1987 deaths
Ambassadors of Sweden to India
Ambassadors of Sweden to Japan
Ambassadors of Sweden to South Korea
Leaders of the Moderate Party
Members of the Riksdag
Swedish people of Jewish descent
Academic staff of Stockholm University
Swedish political scientists
Uppsala University alumni
Recipients of the Illis quorum
20th-century political scientists